Dennis Leyckes (born 20 April 1982, in Krefeld) is a German decathlete.

His personal best score is 8310 points, achieved in June 2006 in Ratingen.

His father Dieter Leyckes won the decathlon silver medal at the 1979 European Junior Championships. He is coached by Torsten Voss.

Achievements

References

EAA profile

1982 births
Living people
German decathletes
Sportspeople from Krefeld
Athletes (track and field) at the 2004 Summer Olympics
Olympic athletes of Germany